Plik Din Su Dao is a 2006 musical/drama/romance TV series produced by Channel 7. It stars Sukollawat Kanarot, Khemanit Jamikorn, Tawin Yavapolkul, and Usamanee Vaithayanon.

Cast
Sukollawat Kanarot as Taywit "Tay"
Khemanit Jamikorn as Rada
Tawin Yavapolkul as Thunwa "Thun"
Usamanee Vaithayanon as Nubdao "Dao"

References

Channel 3 (Thailand) original programming
Thai television soap operas
2000s Thai television series
2006 Thai television series debuts
2006 Thai television series endings